The Kerala Sahitya Akademi Award for Overall Contributions is an award given every year by the Kerala Sahitya Akademi (Kerala Literary Academy) to Malayalam writers for their overall contributions to Malayalam literature. It is one of the twelve categories of the Kerala Sahitya Akademi Award.

Awardees

References

Awards established in 1992
Kerala Sahitya Akademi Awards
Malayalam literary awards
1992 establishments in Kerala